Cricket Fiji is the official governing body of the sport of cricket in Fiji. Its current headquarters is in Suva. The organisation was founded in 1946, as the Fiji Cricket Association, and became an associate member of the International Cricket Council (ICC) in 1965. Fiji falls within the ICC East Asia-Pacific development region.

See also 
 Fiji national cricket team
 Fiji women's national cricket team
 Fiji national under-19 cricket team

References

ESPNcricinfo: Fiji

External links
Official website

Fiji
Cricket
Sports organizations established in 1946
1946 establishments in Fiji
Cricket in Fiji